McCall Salmon is an American softball coach who is the current head coach at Central Michigan.

Coaching career

Central Michigan
On June 20, 2019, Salmon was announced as the new head coach of the Central Michigan softball program.

Head coaching record
Sources:

College

References

Living people
American softball coaches
Female sports coaches
Aquinas Saints softball players
Central Michigan Chippewas softball coaches
Davenport Panthers softball coaches
Year of birth missing (living people)